My Baby is a 1912 American short comedy film directed by  D. W. Griffith and Frank Powell. Prints of the film exist in the film archives of the Museum of Modern Art and the Library of Congress.

Cast
 Mary Pickford as The Wife
 Henry B. Walthall as The Husband
 Eldean Stuart as The Baby
 W. Chrystie Miller as The Grandfather
 Alfred Paget as The Married Sister's Husband
 Madge Kirby as The Wife's Friend
 Lionel Barrymore as At Table
 Elmer Booth as At Table
 Clara T. Bracy as At Table
 John T. Dillon as Wedding Guest / At Table
 Dorothy Gish as Wedding Guest
 Lillian Gish
 Adolph Lestina as At Table
 Walter P. Lewis as Wedding Guest
 Joseph McDermott
 Walter Miller as Wedding Guest
 Jack Pickford as Wedding Guest
 W.C. Robinson as At Table

See also
 D. W. Griffith filmography
 Lillian Gish filmography
 Lionel Barrymore filmography

References

External links

1912 films
Films directed by D. W. Griffith
Films directed by Frank Powell
1912 short films
American silent short films
1912 comedy films
American black-and-white films
Films with screenplays by Anita Loos
Biograph Company films
Silent American comedy films
American comedy short films
1910s American films